Savkari Pash (The Indian Shylock) is Indian cinema's 1925 social melodrama silent film directed by Baburao Painter. V. Shantaram made his acting debut as the young village peasant in the film. Painter later remade Savkari Pash in 1936 as a talkie version. The story of the film was written by Narayan Hari Apte Ref:https://www.marathifilmdata.com/chitrapat/savkari-pash/ as suggested by Baburao Painter
, and is referred to as a "milestone film" in Indian cinema. Along with Shantaram, the rest of the cast included Kamladevi, Zunzharrao Pawar, Kishabapu Bakre, K. Dhaiber and Shankarrao Bute.

The film has been cited as one of the "earliest examples" of parallel cinema in its depiction of real social issues. The story deals with a greedy moneylender who cheats the peasants of their money, forcing them to give up farming and take on jobs as mill-workers.

Cast
V. Shantaram
Kamladevi
Zunzharrao Pawar
Kishabapu Bakre
K. Dhaiber
Shankarrao Bute

References

External links

1925 films
1920s Marathi-language films
Indian silent films
Indian black-and-white films
Melodrama films
Indian drama films
1925 drama films
Silent drama films